Bay View State Park is a public recreation area located on Padilla Bay in Skagit County, Washington, USA. The state park's  include  of shoreline and facilities for camping, picnicking, fishing, swimming and beachcombing. It originated in 1925 when the Skagit County Agricultural Association donated land to the state to be used for park purposes. The park is crossed by a stretch of the Pacific Northwest Trail.

References

External links
Bay View State Park Washington State Parks and Recreation Commission 
Bay View State Park Map Washington State Parks and Recreation Commission

Parks in Skagit County, Washington
State parks of Washington (state)
Protected areas established in 1925
1925 establishments in Washington (state)